Shri P.H. Goswami Municipal Arts & Science College, established in 1961, is a general degree college in Kalol, Gandhinagar, Gujarat. It  is affiliated to Gujarat University and offers undergraduate courses in science and arts.

Departments

Science

Chemistry
Physics 
Mathematics
Zoology
Microbiology

Arts 

English
Gujarati
Economics
Sanskrit
History
Psychology

Accreditation
Shri P.H. Goswami Municipal Arts & Science College was accredited by the National Assessment and Accreditation Council (NAAC).

References

External links
http://www.sciencewithhumanity.org

Colleges affiliated to Gujarat University
Universities and colleges in Gujarat
Gujarat University
Educational institutions established in 1961
1961 establishments in Gujarat